Ponerorchis luteola is a species of flowering plant in the family Orchidaceae, native to south-central China (north-west Yunnan).

Taxonomy
The species was first described in 1996 as Neottianthe luteola. A molecular phylogenetic study in 2014 found that species of Neottianthe, Amitostigma and Ponerorchis were mixed together in a single clade, making none of the three genera monophyletic as then circumscribed. Neottianthe and Amitostigma were subsumed into Ponerorchis, with this species becoming Ponerorchis luteola.

References

luteola
Orchids of Yunnan
Plants described in 1996